The Conference of the New Emerging Forces (CONEFO) was an effort by President Sukarno of Indonesia to create a new bloc of "emerging countries" that would be an alternative power centre to the United Nations and to the "old-established forces"—a category in which Sukarno included both the United States and the Soviet Union. It was intended to build on the legacy of the 1955 Bandung Conference and assert the interests of the Third World and a neutral posture towards the Cold War. 

To host CONEFO, Indonesia constructed a new building complex in Jakarta with the financial aid of People's Republic of China. Since CONEFO never met, the complex – now called the MPR/DPR/DPD building – houses the Indonesian national parliament.

CONEFO was officially established on 7 January 1965, after Sukarno's government objected to Malaysia becoming a non-permanent member of the UN Security Council at a time when Indonesia had declared a low-level conflict called the Konfrontasi (confrontation) against Malaysia. An angry Sukarno took Indonesia out of the UN and formed a rival world organization. He had taken similar steps in 1963 when he created the Games of the New Emerging Forces (GANEFO) as an alternative to the Olympic Games. 

CONEFO was dissolved on 11 August 1966 by General Suharto, who had ousted Sukarno from power.

CONEFO member states
  Indonesia
  China
  North Korea
  North Vietnam

Observers
  Soviet Union
  Cuba
  Yugoslavia
  United Arab Republic
  Palestine Liberation Organization

Notes

References

 
 

Intergovernmental organizations
Organizations established in 1965
Organizations disestablished in 1966
Non-Aligned Movement
20th century in international relations
1965 establishments in Indonesia
1965 disestablishments in Indonesia